Perfect Way or The Perfect Way may refer to:

Books
The Perfect Way (1881), major theosophical work of Anna Kingsford and Edward Maitland
The Perfect Way, poem by eighth-century Chinese Zen master Seng Tsan (僧燦)

Music
"Perfect Way" (Scritti Politti song), a song and single by Scritti Politti from their 1985 album Cupid & Psyche 85
"Perfect Way", instrumental version of the same song by Miles Davis from the 1986 album Tutu
"Perfect Way", a song by Sebadoh from their 1996 album Harmacy
"Perfect Way", a song by Embrace from their 1998 release Come Back to What You Know EP
"The Perfect Way", a song by Costello from the 2006 album Scatterbrain